Helichrysum biafranum is a species of flowering plant in the family Asteraceae. It is found only in Cameroon. Its natural habitat is subtropical or tropical dry forests.

References

biafranum
Flora of Cameroon
Vulnerable plants
Taxonomy articles created by Polbot
Taxa named by Joseph Dalton Hooker